Events from the year 1350 in Ireland.

Incumbent
Lord: Edward III

Events
 Brian Bán Ó Briain, King of Thomond, is killed; restoration of Diarmaid mac Toirdhealbach (see 1343 in Ireland).
 Aodh mac Aodh Bréifneach, last of Clann Mhuircheartaigh sept of O'Connors to hold kingship of Connacht (see 1342 and 1343 in Ireland), is killed by Aodh Bán Ó Ruairc.
Aodh, son of Toirdhealbhach Ó Conchobhair, King of Connacht, is deposed by Edmond Albanach de Burgh in favor of his cousin, Aodh mac Feidhlimidh Ó Conchobhair.
 The Yorkshireman John de St Paul, Archbishop of Dublin, is appointed as Lord Chancellor of Ireland by King Edward III of England.
 June 25 - Great council at Kilkenny.

Births

Deaths
Uilliam Ó Dubhda, Bishop of Killala

References

"The Annals of Ireland by Friar John Clyn", edited and translated with an Introduction, by Bernadette Williams, Four Courts Press, 2007. , pp. 240–244.
"A New History of Ireland VIII: A Chronology of Irish History to 1976", edited by T. W. Moody, F.X. Martin and F.J. Byrne. Oxford, 1982. .
http://www.ucc.ie/celt/published/T100001B/index.html
http://www.ucc.ie/celt/published/T100005C/index.html
http://www.ucc.ie/celt/published/T100010B/index.html

 
1350s in Ireland
Ireland
Years of the 14th century in Ireland